American Honey is a 2016 road drama film written and directed by Andrea Arnold. The film stars Sasha Lane, Shia LaBeouf and Riley Keough. American Honey follows Star (Lane), a young girl from a troubled home, who runs away with a traveling sales crew who drive across the American Midwest selling magazine subscriptions door to door. Principal photography began in May 2015 with filming taking place in several states across America. It is Arnold's first film to be set and filmed outside the United Kingdom.

The film was selected to compete for the Palme d'Or at the 2016 Cannes Film Festival where it won the Jury Prize. American Honey received positive reviews, with Lane's performance receiving critical praise and accolades along with those of LaBeouf and Keough. The film was released in the U.S. on 30 September 2016, by A24 and in the UK on 14 October 2016 by Universal Pictures. For the 70th BAFTA Awards, American Honey received a nomination for Best British Film.

Plot
Star is living in Muskogee, Oklahoma. She lives a painful life, caring for two children that aren't hers and living with their sexually abusive father, Nathan. While trying to hitchhike home one day, she spies a van full of young people and makes eye contact with Jake, one of the boys in the group. Star follows them to a local Kmart and sees Jake dance to "We Found Love" on top of the registers before being forced out of the store. Star returns Jake's phone, as it had fallen out of his pocket, and he offers her a job as part of their magazine sales crew, telling her to come with him to Kansas City. Star declines but Jake nevertheless tells her to meet them in the parking lot of the local Motel 6 the next morning.

Packing her belongings while Nathan is in another room, Star secretly escapes and takes the children to the club where their stepmother Misty dances. Star confronts Misty and tells her it's her turn to care for the kids, and though Misty refuses, Star runs away from the club to the motel and sleeps outside the crew's van until morning.

Star is interviewed by the crew's leader, Krystal, who hires her after she establishes that Star is a legal person, that no one will miss her, and that she promises to work hard. In the car on the way to Kansas, Star meets the other members of the crew. When they get there, they disperse into groups of two. Since Star is new, she is paired with Jake, the veteran of the group. Star finds it difficult to sell as Jake lies to a potential customer in order to make money. Star also distracts Jake by flirting with and eventually kissing him. That night, Krystal calls Star in and tells her that Jake has posted his lowest sales ever. Krystal then has Jake put tanning lotion on her body as Star watches, and Star promises to improve.

The following day, annoyed by Jake, Star vows to outsell him. Star is picked up by three strangers in cowboy hats who offer to help her, thinking she is being harassed by Jake. The trio bring her to their home and offer to buy several subscriptions if she eats the worm at the bottom of a bottle of mezcal. Star does, and makes the sale. Jake, however, fearing the worst, arrives and threatens the men with a gun before stealing their car. Initially angry at Jake, Star is later touched that he came to find her, and the two have sex in the car. When they return to the hotel for the evening, Jake tells her not to mention their relationship, and he gives the money Star earned to Krystal.

For a while, things between Jake and Star are tense, and Krystal threatens to drop her on the side of the road if she keeps causing trouble. The crew ends up living temporarily in a rundown house, and Jake and Star renew their relationship. Star asks him what his dreams are, and he shows her his private stash of cash and items he's stolen from the houses he visits, which he intends to use to buy a home.

Krystal dumps the girls off where oil workers are about to go to work in the morning. Star climbs in the back of their truck and tries to sell to them, but one of the oil workers tells her he'll pay her five hundred dollars to go on a date with him. Star asks for a thousand and performs sexually for the money. After the guy drops her off, she hears him being attacked. Shortly after, a bloodied Jake asks her if she was hurt by the man and later asks if she slept with him. Star eventually admits what happened, causing Jake to get angry, smashing the belongings in the house before running off.

The following morning, the crew get in the car and there is a new girl there, while Jake is missing. Krystal calls Star to her room and informs her she has let Jake go, that she paid him money for each girl he recruited, and that he slept with all of them. Krystal later takes them to a poor area in Rapid City, South Dakota to sell subscriptions. Star enters a house and meets several affable children whose mother is on drugs. As Star's own mother died of a meth overdose, she feels sympathetic toward them and goes out to buy them groceries. At the pickup that day, Jake is in the van, and Star is confused as to whether to be happy to see him or not.

That evening, the crew light a bonfire. Dancing around the fire, Star is pulled aside by Jake, who privately hands her a turtle. Star takes it to the edge of the water and releases it before following the turtle into the water. Star then immerses herself fully before rising out of the water.

Cast

 Sasha Lane as Star
 Shia LaBeouf as Jake
 Riley Keough as Krystal
 Arielle Holmes as Pagan
 McCaul Lombardi as Corey
 Crystal B. Ice as Katness
 Chad McKenzie Cox as Billy
 Garry Howell as Austin
 Kenneth Kory Tucker as Sean
 Raymond Coalson as JJ
 Isaiah Stone as Kalium
 Dakota Powers as Runt
 Shawna Rae Moseley as Shunta
 Christopher David Wright as Riley
 Verronikah Ezell as QT
 Will Patton as Backseat Cowboy
 Bruce Gregory as Cattle Truck Driver
 Johnny Pierce II as Nathan
 Laura Kirk as Laura
 Summer Hunsaker as Kelsey
 Brody Hunsaker as Rubin
 Chasity Hunsaker as Misty

Production

Development
Arnold began writing the screenplay in 2013 and it was first announced under the pre-production title Mag Crew at Film4's 2013 Cannes Film Festival party. Arnold has said the movie was inspired by an investigative piece she read in The New York Times about mag crews. The film was optioned from The Times and Ian Urbina in 2008. Arnold became inspired by lives of American youths in "magazine crews" who travel the United States selling magazine subscriptions, an occupation that has caused controversy in the United States. In researching for the film, Arnold embarked on a road trip from California to Miami, Florida.  In late 2013, Arnold was the Filmmaker-in-Residence at the New York Film Festival. During this time, she worked on the second draft of the script and used the opportunity to meet with potential casting directors.

In 2014, the film's producers and new title, American Honey, were announced. In March 2015, casting took place in Oklahoma in preparation for a summer shoot.

Casting
Arnold "street cast" by searching beaches, streets, and approaching drunk teenagers. Arnold discovered Sasha Lane while she was on spring break with her friends; Lane decided to audition for the film and was cast in the lead role. The remainder of the cast were found in parking lots, construction sites, streets, and state fairs. In April 2015, Shia LaBeouf was cast in an unspecified role. In early June, Arielle Holmes was reported to have joined the cast.

Filming
In May 2015, filming was reported in Muskogee, Okmulgee, and Norman, Oklahoma. In late May 2015, production was reported in Mission Hills, Kansas and areas of Kansas City, Missouri. and the police of Missouri Valley, Iowa reported that the film had recently shot in their city. 1–8 June filming took place at a private residence in Bennington as well as around Newport Landing.  On 9 June, production was taking place in Omaha, Nebraska and Grand Island, Nebraska. On 24 June, LaBeouf was hospitalized after being injured on set during filming in Williston, North Dakota. Filming wrapped on 5 July 2015. The film was shot over 56 days, in several states.

Soundtrack 

According to music critic Robert Christgau, the film's soundtrack album went "unheralded" but "makes a single living thing of Rae Sremmurd and the Raveonettes, E-40 and Steve Earle as the must-see Andrea Arnold flick it's attached to follows a troupe of young magazine-subscription hustlers across flyover country more humane than its taste in presidents might lead cineastes to believe." In a decade-end list, Christgau named it the third-best album of the 2010s. The film derives its title from "American Honey", a 2010 hit single by American country music group Lady Antebellum, that is sung along to by the sales crew in a pivotal scene.

Release
In January 2016, A24 acquired distribution rights to the film. In May 2016, Universal Pictures and Focus Features acquired international distribution rights to the film. The film had its world premiere at the 2016 Cannes Film Festival on 15 May 2016, where it was selected to compete for the Palme d'Or. The film also screened at the Toronto International Film Festival on 8 September 2016, Fantastic Fest, and the BFI London Film Festival on 7 October 2016.

American Honey was theatrically released in the United States on 30 September 2016 and on 14 October in the United Kingdom.

Reception

Critical response 

American Honey received mostly positive reviews upon its premiere at the 2016 Cannes Film Festival. The film holds a 79% approval rating on review aggregator website Rotten Tomatoes, based on 218 reviews, with an average rating of 7.4/10. The website's critical consensus reads, "American Honey offers a refreshingly unconventional take on the coming-of-age drama whose narrative risks add up to a rewarding experience even if they don't all pay off." On review aggregator Metacritic, it holds an 80 out of 100 rating, based on reviews from 41 critics, indicating "generally favorable reviews."

American Honey was also placed on several publications's "Best of the 2016 Cannes Film Festival" and "Best of the 2016 Toronto Film Festival" lists. Variety placed Sasha Lane's performance in the film at number 3 on their list of the 9 breakout performances of the 2016 Toronto Film Festival. The film won the 2016 Cannes Film Festival's Jury Prize, and received a special commendation from its Ecumenical Jury. This is Arnold's third time winning the Jury Prize, after Red Road in 2006 and Fish Tank in 2009.

Guy Lodge of Variety was extremely positive, writing, "Part dreamy millennial picaresque, part distorted tapestry of Americana and part exquisitely illustrated iTunes musical, "Honey" daringly commits only to the loosest of narratives across its luxurious 162-minute running time. Yet it's constantly, engrossingly active, spinning and sparking and exploding in cycles like a Fourth of July Catherine wheel." Eric Kohn of Indiewire was enthusiastic, writing that American Honey "proves Andrea Arnold is one of the best working filmmakers and finds a breakout star in Sasha Lane," and that "It's the closest thing to a magnum opus in Arnold's blossoming career." David Rooney of The Hollywood Reporter called the film "A road movie without a map that nonetheless arrives at a worthwhile destination," and wrote, "The film works best as a poignant character study, observing Star as she settles into her independence and figures out who she wants to be, framed by a vast physical landscape that stretches socioeconomically from privileged wealth to squalid poverty. There's a wonderful intimacy in the way Arnold examines young women in her films."

Accolades

References

External links
 
 
 
 
 

2010s coming-of-age drama films
2010s drama road movies
A24 (company) films
2016 independent films
British coming-of-age drama films
British drama road movies
2010s English-language films
Films directed by Andrea Arnold
British independent films
Films about poverty in the United States
Films about runaways
Films set in Missouri
Films set in South Dakota
Films shot in North Dakota
Films shot in Kansas
Films shot in Iowa
Films shot in Missouri
Films shot in Oklahoma
Films shot in Nebraska
Film4 Productions films
American independent films
American drama road movies
American coming-of-age drama films
2016 drama films
2010s American films
2010s British films